Shapell may refer to:

People
David Shapell (1921-2015), Polish-born American Holocaust survivor, real estate developer and philanthropist from Los Angeles, California. 
Nathan Shapell (1922–2007), Polish-born American Holocaust survivor, real estate developer and philanthropist from Los Angeles, California.
Vera Guerin, née Vera Shapell, American billionaire heiress and musical theatre producer.

Other
Shapell Industries, one of the largest real estate development companies in Southern California.
Shapell Manuscript Foundation (SMF), non-profit independent educational organization dedicated to research and the collection of historical documents and original manuscripts.